James Atherton ( 16241710)  was an early settler and one of the founders of Lancaster, Massachusetts. He emigrated to the New England Colonies from the parish of Wigan, Lancashire, England in 1635.

Emigration
The Massachusetts Bay Colony had been founded by the owners of the Massachusetts Bay Company, which included investors in the failed Dorchester Company which had established a short-lived settlement on Cape Ann in 1623. The colony began in 1628 and was the company's second attempt at colonization. It was successful, with about 20,000 people migrating to New England in the 1630s. Atherton was part of this first wave of Puritan migration to New England (1620–1640). Atherton was a child emigrant.

Biographers agree that he travelled from Lancashire to Bristol and then sailed on the James, in the company of the Reverend Richard Mather; a minister from his home town and  Humphrey Atherton, an elder relative (but not a sibling). The latter would later become the mayor general of the Massachusetts Bay Colony troops.

On June 4, 1635, he set sail for the New World aboard the ship James. However quotating another source, it sailed days earlier;

As the ship James approached New England, a hurricane struck and it was forced to ride it out just off the coast of modern-day Hampton, New Hampshire. According to the ship's log and the Journal of Richard Mather. 1635: His life and death. 1670, the following was recorded;

Atherton arrived in Boston on August 17, 1635, after weathering the Great Colonial Hurricane of 1635.

Arrival in Massachusetts Bay Colony
He and his elder kinsman Humphrey Atherton, resided in Dorchester. He worked as a tanner  and once he met the required age he went on to serve in the local militia within Captain John Whiting's Company.

Move to Lancaster
Atherton having become of age in Dorchester, was one of the earliest settlers of Lancaster, Massachusetts, accompanying John Prescott, who had obtained rights to settle in an area then known as Nashaway Plantation.

Atherton's lot was situated on Neck Road. The precise time of early settlers arriving in Lancaster is not known. Initial lots of land had been allocated to Richard Linton, Lawrence Waters and John Ball, prior to the arrival c.1643 of Atherton and his peers; the Prescott's and the Sawyer's. Over the next seven years very little was done to advance the settlement of the Nashaway plantation.

Atherton went on to become one of the founders of Lancaster at the time of its incorporation. He is listed as an official planter as of January 1653.

Once more than nine families had settled, the planters petitioned the general court to be incorporated as a town, which was subsequently granted on May 18, 1653. The settlement was named Lancaster. It was likely chosen because of the ancestral connection Atherton shared with his neighbors, the Prescott's and Houghton's.

The first town meeting on record was held in the summer of 1654, once the petition was granted. At the next meeting it was voted not to take into the town above thirty-five families, and the names of the following 22 townsmen that approved this, were:

Edward Breek, Mr. Joseph Rowlandson (minister), John Prescott, William Kerley, Ralph Houghton, Thomas Sawyer, John Whitcomb, John Whitcomb, jr., Richard Linton, John Johnson, John Moore, William Lewis, John Lewis, Thomas James, Edmund Parker, James Atherton, Henry Kerley, Richard Smith, William Kerley, jr., John Smith, Lawrence Waters and John White 

In 1659 the town of Lancaster revoked the order limiting the settlers to 35, which followed a rapid increase in the population.

Lancaster Raid

It is unknown when Atherton left Lancaster for Milton, which at the time was part of Dorchester. Lancaster was still an isolated village on February 10, 1676, when a force of 1,500 Wampanoag, Nipmuc, and Narragansett Indians carried out a dawn attack, in what would become known as the Lancaster raid.

Fortified  garrison houses were set on fire, including the home of Rev. Joseph Rowlandson and 30 people killed. Most houses were destroyed and Mary Rowlandson and some of her children were taken hostage.  This resulted in the abandonment of the settlement by most of the inhabitants who left by way of carts sent by the General Court during March 1676.

Personal
He married Hannah (died 1713) in Lancaster c.1653. They had eight children: James, Hannah, Joshua, Hannah (2nd), Mary, Elizabeth, Deborah  and Joseph.

His youngest son Joseph, served in Sir William Phips’ unsuccessful expedition against the French in Quebec. In 1690 he was a member of Captain John Withington's Company of Dorchester, along with his neighbor, Benjamin Willard, as part of a 2000 strong militia. After a victory in the Battle of Port Royal during May 1690, they departed Boston in August for Quebec. Joseph died during, or in the aftermath of Battle of Quebec.

According to some sources he chose to convey his lands in Lancaster to his eldest son, James (a weaver) in 1698.

However, in 1704, both he and his two surviving sons, James and Joshua were ordered to strengthen their garrisons in Lancaster.

Ancestry
He was related to Major General Humphrey Atherton, who up until his death in 1661 was the most powerful military leader in the colony. It was Humphrey's father who owned land in the parish of Wigan. Humphrey sat on the General Court of the Massachusetts Bay Colony and was instrumental in getting the settlement of Lancaster incorporated as a town in 1652.

Atherton Bridge, Massachusetts
The sign commemorating Atherton Bridge states:

Death
Atherton died in Sherborn, Massachusetts on August 6, 1710, at the home of his only surviving daughter Deborah, wife of Captain Samuel Bullard.

He is buried at the Old South Cemetery in Sherborn, Massachusetts. Probate occurred a few months after. His wife died 3 years later.

Notable descendants
 Lizzie Aiken  (1817–1906), a Union Army Civil War nurse
 Alfred Atherton (1921–2002), former U.S. Ambassador to Egypt
 Alfred Bennison Atherton (1843–1921), Canadian physician
 Blaylock Atherton (1900–1963), a 20th century politician from New Hampshire 
 Charles G. Atherton (1804–1853), an American politician and lawyer from New Hampshire
 Charles Henry Atherton (1932–2005), FAIA, was an American architect and former secretary of the U.S. Commission of Fine Arts from 1960 to 2004
 Charles Humphrey Atherton (1773–1853), an American Federalist politician, banker and a distinguished attorney from New Hampshire.
 Charlie Atherton (1874–1935), a Major League Baseball third baseman. Nicknamed "Prexy"
 Cornelius Atherton (1737–1809), an iron manufacturer, gunmaker for the American Revolutionary War and an inventor
 Faxon Atherton (1815–1877), businessman, trader and landowner in Chile; and then in San Mateo County, California
 George Washington Atherton (1837–1906), soldier and educator. He was president of the Pennsylvania State University
 Henry B. Atherton (1835–1906), a soldier in the American Civil War from Vermont, a lawyer and state legislator for New Hampshire during the late 19th century.
 Henry F. Atherton (1883–1949), American business executive, Lawyer and Harvard Alumni. Member of the New York State Bar Association from 1909.
 Henry Valpey Atherton (1911–1967), a prosecutor at the Nuremberg Trials
 Joshua Atherton (1737–1809), a lawyer and early anti-slavery campaigner in Massachusetts and New Hampshire.
 Joseph Ballard Atherton (1837–1903), 19th century businessman
 Peter Atherton (1704–1764), an 18th century colonial leader from Massachusetts  
 Simon Atherton (1803–1888), was an early American Shaker, who became highly successful on behalf of his own community, in selling herbs in Boston
 Thomas H. Atherton (1884–1978), an American architect. He studied at Princeton and MIT. He co-designed the Pennsylvania WWI war memorial in France
 Warren Atherton (1891 – 1976), an American attorney who served as the National Commander of The American Legion from 1943 to 1944
 William Atherton (born 1947), actor 
 Seth Boyden (1788–1870), inventor
 Uriah Atherton Boyden (1804–1879), inventor from Foxborough, Massachusetts best known for the development of the Boyden Turbine
 Henry Atherton Frost (1883–1952), an architect and instructor at Harvard University
 Alfred S. Hartwell (1836–1912), lawyer and American Civil War soldier, who then had another career as cabinet minister and judge in the Kingdom of Hawaii
 Charles Atherton Hartwell, mustered as a private in he 7th New York State Militia regiment, He was brevetted Brigadier General, US Volunteers on December 2, 1865 for "gallant and meritorious services during the war". He remained in the Regular Army after the end of the conflict, dying while on active duty in Castroville, Texas in 1876 while at the rank of captain.

References

1620s births
1710 deaths
Year of birth uncertain
People of colonial Massachusetts
People from colonial Boston
English emigrants
Kingdom of England emigrants to Massachusetts Bay Colony
People from Milton, Massachusetts 
People from Lancaster, Massachusetts
 tanners